Dividing Creek is a census-designated place and  unincorporated community that is a part of Downe Township in Cumberland County, in the U.S. state of New Jersey.

Dividing Creek has a post office with ZIP code 08315.

Demographics

References

Downe Township, New Jersey
Census-designated places in New Jersey
Census-designated places in Cumberland County, New Jersey
Unincorporated communities in Cumberland County, New Jersey
Unincorporated communities in New Jersey